

External links
 
 CineCity film festival

Cinemas in East Sussex
Clayton & Black buildings
Grade II listed buildings in Brighton and Hove
Grade II listed cinemas
1910 establishments in England